Kentucky Route 259 (KY 259) is a  state highway that traverses five counties in west-central Kentucky.

Route description

Warren and Edmonson Counties
KY 259's southern terminus is located at the intersection with the concurrently running U.S. Route 68 (US 68) and KY 80 in Hays, in far eastern Warren County. The first few miles of the highway is a one-lane road throughout its run in Warren County. It crosses Interstate 65 (I-65) via an overpass shortly before crossing the Edmonson County line, where the road widens to two lanes. Shortly after the entry into Edmonson County, it reaches the community of Rocky Hill, where it intersects KY 1339 (Apple Grove Road). It then crosses US 31W just north of Rocky Hill, and then turns northwest to intersect KY 422 and KY 2325 (Silent Grove Church Road) in the Pig community. When it meets KY 101 in Rhoda, KY 259 turns right and continues northward to Brownsville, where it runs concurrently with Kentucky Route 70 throughout much of its course through the town, over the Green River to a point near the Riverhill Shopping Center.

After leaving Brownsville, KY 259 then traverses the communities of Lindseyville, Sweeden (where it intersects KY 728), and Bee Spring (where it intersects KY 238). KY 259 skirts the Nolin Lake area after passing through the community of Broadway.

Three different sections of KY 259 in Edmonson and Warren counties are marked as portion of the Duncan Hines Scenic Byway, a part of the state's scenic byway system.

Grayson County
KY 259 enters Grayson County just northwest of the Moutardier Marina (accessible from KY 259's junction with KY 2067) and continues on through Anneta and Meredith. It intersects a very short KY 226, and then enters the city of Leitchfield. It intersects the Wendell H. Ford Western Kentucky Parkway at its exit 107 interchange and meets US 62 in downtown Leitchfield. It also meets the eastern terminus of KY 54 (Owensboro Road) at the public square. After the second intersection of the KY 3155 (William Thomason Byway) (the first one was after the Western Kentucky Parkway interchange), KY 259 continues northward to cross a portion of Rough River Lake.

Breckinridge and Meade Counties
After crossing Rough River Lake into Breckinridge County, it has a junction with Kentucky Route 79. KY 259 and KY 79 run concurrently while bridging another part of Rough River Lake. They reach the US 60 junction at Harned. KY 259 turns left to run concurrently with US 60 westbound, while KY 79 makes a right turn to join US 60 eastbound. After splitting from US 60 at its KY 261, KY 259 turns north and enters the city of Hardinsburg and then continues north through Union Star, then closely follows the southern banks of the Ohio River, and enters the western portion of Meade County shortly before reaching its northern terminus at KY 144 at Rhodelia.

History

In the beginning, KY 259 only ran from Hardinsburg to Rhodelia, in Breckinridge and western Meade Counties. The highway from Hays to Harned began its history as Kentucky Route 65 at the time of its commission. KY 65 originally had a total length of an estimated .

The then-KY 65 (during its concurrency with KY 70) in Edmonson County crossed the Green River by ferry until it was re-routed onto a bridge in the 1950s.

At one point between 1959 and 1963, KY 65 was redesignated as the current KY 259, extending that route to its current longevity. This was done in order to avoid confusion between it and the then-planned-and-under-construction Interstate 65 (I-65) in the Edmonson/Warren/Barren County area, and its entire course through west-central Kentucky, which was completed in 1967. To date, there has never been another KY 65 designation. The renumbering to the current KY 259 was done to comply with the state's longtime state route numbering policy, which had forbidden duplication of highway numbers was to be allowed in the state. The former KY 64 in this region was also compliant with that policy after Interstate 64 came under construction in north-central and northeast Kentucky. As of May 2017, the only exceptions to the rule against highway number duplications are US 79 and KY 79, which intersected in Russellville until a bypass was partly signed as US 79; I-69 and KY 69 in separate regions of western Kentucky, I-169 and KY 169, and most recently, I-165 and KY 165; the latter two latter are in completely different regions of the state.

In early 2001, the KYTC began construction of a two-lane bypass corridor from Brownsville's southern outskirts to just north of Chalybeate, including the rerouting of KY 259 from Rhoda to Brownsville, along with the final stretch of KY 101 in the Rhoda area. Once it was completed in November 2001, the two routes were reconstructed to include intersections with the new alignment. Once those were done in 2002, the KYTC assigned the old alignments then-new state route designations of KY 3019 and KY 3021.

Points of interest along the route
Edmonson County Lion's Club Fairgrounds, near Rhoda. Home to the annual Edmonson County Fair (held in early September) 
Bee Spring Park.  
Moutardier Marina (via KY 2067), south of Anneta.
Grayson County Airport, near Meredith 
Grayson Connty Fairgrounds, north of Leitchfield.

Major intersections

Related routes
Kentucky Route 3019
Kentucky Route 3021

References

External links
KY 259 at Kentucky Roads
Edmonson County Tourism Commission
Graysom County Tourism

 
0259
0259
0259
0259
0259
0259